Mario Bonotti was an Italian film editor. While much of his work was in popular genre cinema, he also edited several post-war neorealist films such as The Bandit (1946) and Without Pity (1948). He had an acting role in the 1953 film Love in the City.

Selected filmography
 Black Shirt (1933)
 Two Million for a Smile (1939)
 Maddalena, Zero for Conduct (1940)
 Bridge of Glass (1940)
 The Cavalier from Kruja (1940)
 Saint Rogelia (1940)
 The Sin of Rogelia Sanchez (1940)
 Teresa Venerdì (1941)
 Forbidden Music (1942)
 A Garibaldian in the Convent (1942)
 Giacomo the Idealist (1943)
 The Children Are Watching Us (1944)
 The Gates of Heaven (1945)
 The Bandit (1946)
 Without Pity (1948)
 Escape to France (1948)
 Variety Lights (1950)
 The Passaguai Family (1951)
 Beauties in Capri (1952)
 Toto in Color (1952)
 Barefoot Savage (1952)
 Aida (1953)
 Love in the City (1953)
 If You Won a Hundred Million (1953)
 Tripoli, Beautiful Land of Love (1954)
 The Captive City (1962)

References

Bibliography 
 Mauricio Ponzi. The films of Gina Lollobrigida. Citadel Press, 1982.

External links 
 

Italian film editors
Year of birth unknown
Year of death unknown
20th-century Italian people